Malec may refer to:

 Malec (surname)
 Malec, Podlaskie Voivodeship (north-east Poland)
 Malec, Lesser Poland Voivodeship (south Poland)
 Maleč, village in Vysočina Region, Czech Republic
 Małec, Lesser Poland Voivodeship (south Poland)

See also